The 2011 ACC football season is an NCAA football season that will be played from September 1, 2011, to January 4, 2012. The Atlantic Coast Conference consists of 12 members in two divisions. The Atlantic division consists of Boston College, Clemson, Florida State, Maryland, North Carolina State and Wake Forest. The Coastal division consists of Duke, Georgia Tech, Miami, North Carolina, Virginia, and Virginia Tech. The division champions will meet on December 3 in the 2011 ACC Championship Game, located in Charlotte, North Carolina at Bank of America Stadium.

Preseason

Preseason Poll
The 2011 ACC Preseason Poll was announced at the ACC Football Kickoff meetings in Pinehurst, North Carolina on July 25. Virginia Tech was voted to win Coastal division while Florida State was voted to win the Atlantic division and the conference. Montel Harris of Boston College was voted the Preseason ACC Player of the Year.

Atlantic Division poll
 Florida State – 420 (65 first place votes)
 Clemson – 286 (4)
 North Carolina State – 270
 Boston College – 224 (2)
 Maryland – 211
 Wake Forest – 80

Coastal Division poll
 Virginia Tech – 421 (66)
 Miami – 328 (4)
 North Carolina – 287
 Georgia Tech – 226 (1)
 Virginia – 132
 Duke – 96

Predicted ACC Championship Game Winner
 Florida State–50
 Virginia Tech–18
 Clemson–2
 Boston College–1

Preseason ACC Player of the Year
Montel Harris, BC – 26
E. J. Manuel, FSU – 14
Luke Kuechly, BC – 12
David Wilson, Virginia Tech – 8
Danny O'Brien, Maryland – 4
Andre Ellington, CLEM – 3
Lamar Miller, MIA – 2
Sean Spence, MIA – 1
Brandon Jenkins, FSU – 1

Preseason All Conference Teams

Offense

Defense

Specialist

Coaches
During the offseason, two ACC schools, Maryland and Miami, hired new head coaches.  Maryland bought out the last year of 10 year coach, Ralph Friedgen's contract.  They hired Randy Edsall who had been the head coach at UConn for 12 years.  Miami fired their head coach of 4 years, Randy Shannon, at the conclusion of the Hurricanes' regular season.  They in turn hired coach Al Golden, who was the 5 year head coach of Temple. In an unexpected turn of events, on July 27, 2011, UNC chancellor Holden Thorp announced that the UNC Board of Trustees decided to dismiss Butch Davis as the head coach of the football team.  The announcement came a week before the start of fall training camp. The firing was cited as being due to the investigations by the NCAA into academic fraud, impermissible benefits, and talking to agents in the 2010 season. The next day on the 28th, Everett Withers, the defensive coordinator of the past 3 years, was named as the interim head coach.

NOTE: Stats shown are before the beginning of the season

ACC vs. BCS opponents
The Atlantic Coast Conference had a losing season vs. BCS opponents in 2011 with a record of 8 wins and 13 losses. In rivalry games vs. BCS opponents the ACC went 1-4 with the only win coming from the Florida State Seminoles over the Florida Gators. The ACC also had three teams play Notre Dame in 2011 and recorded a 0-3 record against the Fighting Irish.

NOTE:. Games with a * next to the home team represent a neutral site game

Rankings

Bowl Games

Postseason

All-conference teams

First Team

Offense

Defense

Second Team

Offense

Defense

ACC Individual Awards

ACC Player of the Year
RB David Wilson- Virginia Tech

Offensive Player of the Year
RB David Wilson- Virginia Tech

Defensive Player of the Year
LB Luke Kuechly- Boston College

Rookie of the Year
WR Sammy Watkins- Clemson

Offensive Rookie of the Year
WR Sammy Watkins- Clemson

Defensive Rookie of the Year
CB Merrill Noel- Wake Forest

Coach of the Year
Mike London- Virginia

Brian Piccolo Award
RB Giovani Bernard- North Carolina

Jim Tatum Award
WR Danny Coale- Virginia Tech

National Awards

Butkus Award
LB Luke Kuechly- Boston College

John Mackey Award
TE Dwayne Allen- Clemson

Lombardi Award
LB Luke Kuechly- Boston College

Jack Tatum Award
CB David Amerson- NC State

References